CJSC "Pallada Asset Management" is the oldest Russian management company specializing in asset management. Russian and foreign citizens, pension funds, insurance companies, investment funds as well as other organizations entrust the company the management of their money. The company head office locates in Moscow. It is a part of Investment Group Russian Funds.

History
CJSC “Pallada Asset Management” was one of the first in Russia who has registered unit trust “Pallada – state securities fund” in 1996 (that became   OEIF “Pallada – bonds” since 2006). The company manages pension funds of Russian Federation pension fund since year 2003. In 2010 CJSC “Pallada Asset Management” acquired in management the unit trusts formerly managed by management company “RBusiness” previously known as management company of Rosbank. (OEIFMI “Granat”, OEIFB “Sapfir”, OIF “Izumrud – index MICEX”, OEIFMI “Topaz”, IMFS “Almaz” and IUIBF “Ametist”), as well as unit trust formerly managed by “Management company Alemar” Ltd (OEIF “Alemar – stock fund”, OEIF “Alemar – bond fund”, OEIFMI “Alemar – active operations”).

Management
General director – Ivan Yurjevich Rudenko. He is employed in “Russian Funds” company since 2003. He took such posts analyst, trader, deputy chief of financing  attraction department, head of the bank investing department of Russian Funds Investment Group. Except of general management he is chairman of Investment Committee and takes the final decisions about general asset management strategy.

References

External links
 Official company website
 Management Company CJSC “Pallada Asset Management” card at SCRIN website
 Management Company CJSC “Pallada Asset Management” card at the National Managers League website
 Management Company CJSC “Pallada Asset Management” card at the Investfunds website

1995 establishments in Russia
Investment companies of Russia